The Free Motherland - UCA Alliance (Azat Hayrenik - KMD Dashink) is a political alliance in Artsakh formed by the Free Motherland and United Civic Alliance parties. The alliance was formed in January 2020, prior to the 2020 Artsakhian general election. The leader of the alliance is Arayik Harutyunyan.

Composition 
The alliance is composed of the following parties:

In addition, the alliance was supported and endorsed by the Artsakh Freedom Party, Movement 88, and the Armenakan Party.

Electoral record

General elections

See also

List of political parties in Artsakh
Politics of Artsakh

References

2020 establishments in Asia
2020 establishments in Europe
Political parties established in 2020
Political parties in the Republic of Artsakh
Political party alliances in Asia
Political party alliances in Europe